Brockton was an Ontario provincial electoral district in the old City of Toronto's west-end. It was represented in the Legislative Assembly of Ontario from 1926 until 1934, when it was abolished and redistributed into the Parkdale and Dovercourt districts.  Its only Member of the Legislative Assembly (MLA) was Fred McBrien. When his district was abolished, he decided not to seek re-election in another district.

Boundaries
The northern boundary was the city's northern boundary with York Township, starting at Lavender Road, through the northern side of Rowntree Avenue, continuing just north of  Innes Avenue, through Prospect Cemetery and ending at Morrison Avenue. It then went southwards along its eastern border on the western edge of Dufferin Street to Lake Ontario.  The western border picked up on land on Dowling Avenue and then jogged west on the north side of Queen Street West to the east side of Sorauren Avenue. It continued north on Sorauren to the south side of Dundas Street West, where it then ran east until the Canadian National Railway (C.N.R.) tracks. It then went north along the tracks and connected with the northern boundary at the city limits, just south of Lavender Road.

Members of Provincial Parliament

Election results

1926 Ontario general election

1929 Ontario general election

References

Notes

Citations

Former provincial electoral districts of Ontario
Provincial electoral districts of Toronto